The Cathedral of Our Lady of the Rosary is located in Kunkuri town in Jashpur district of Chhattisgarh state in India. The cathedral was founded in 1962 in the period of Rev. Bishop Stanislas Tigga. Fr. J. M. Karsi drew its map. Br. Joseph Toppo started its construction. After his death Fr. Manustain S. J. completed its construction in the period of Bishop Francis Ekka. It was Inaugurated on 27 October 1979.

The Catholic cathedral at Kunkuri is the biggest church in the state. It is India's largest in terms of seating capacity.

The Cathedral of Our Lady of the Rosary is under the jurisdiction of the Roman Catholic Diocese of Jashpur

References

External links
Global Catholic Churches
Tourism in Jashpur District
Union of Catholic Asian News UCAN

Roman Catholic cathedrals in India
Churches in Chhattisgarh
1962 establishments in Madhya Pradesh
Roman Catholic churches completed in 1979
20th-century Roman Catholic church buildings in India